is a Japanese professional footballer who plays as a defensive midfielder for Sanfrecce Hiroshima.

Career
Aoyama was born in Kurashiki. After featuring in 2014 FIFA World Cup, in May 2018 he was named in the Japan national team's preliminary squad for the 2018 FIFA World Cup in Russia. However, he got injured and he did not make the final cut.

Career statistics

Club

International

Scores and results list Japan's goal tally first, score column indicates score after each Aoyama goal.

Honours
Sanfrecce Hiroshima
J1 League: 2012, 2013, 2015
J2 League: 2008
J.League Cup: 2022
Japanese Super Cup: 2008, 2013, 2014, 2016

Japan
EAFF East Asian Cup: 2013
AFC Asian Cup runner-up: 2019

Individual
J.League MVP Award: 2015
J.League Best XI: 2012, 2013, 2015

References

External links
 
 
 
 
 Profile at Sanfrecce Hiroshima

1986 births
Living people
Association football midfielders
Association football people from Okayama Prefecture
Japanese footballers
Japan international footballers
J1 League players
J2 League players
Sanfrecce Hiroshima players
J1 League Player of the Year winners
Footballers at the 2006 Asian Games
2014 FIFA World Cup players
2019 AFC Asian Cup players
Asian Games competitors for Japan